William Eddleman Queen (November 28, 1928 – April 23, 2006) nicknamed "Doc", was an American outfielder in Major League Baseball.

A right fielder, he was hitless in his only two at bats in three games. He struck out against Harvey Haddix of the St. Louis Cardinals on April 24, and whiffed the following day against Al Brazle.
He then was sent to the Triple-A Toledo Sox to continue what would be a 14-season (1947–1960) minor league career.

Queen died in Gastonia at the age of 77.

See also
1954 Milwaukee Braves season
Atlanta Braves all-time roster

References

External links
Baseball Reference
Retrosheet
Venezuelan Professional Baseball League

1928 births
2006 deaths
Austin Senators players
Baseball players from North Carolina
Centauros de Maracaibo players
Bluefield Blue-Grays players
Eau Claire Bears players
Evansville Braves players
Gavilanes de Maracaibo players
Houston Buffaloes players
Lácteos de Pastora players
Major League Baseball right fielders
Memphis Chickasaws players
Mount Vernon Kings players
Milwaukee Braves players
Paducah Chiefs players
People from Gastonia, North Carolina
Omaha Cardinals players
Sacramento Solons players
Toledo Sox players
Wichita Falls Spudders players